The 1993 CFL Draft composed of seven rounds where 54 Canadian football players were chosen from eligible Canadian universities and Canadian players playing in the NCAA. This was the first draft since 1981 to feature only seven rounds and the first in the modern era of CFL Drafts. The 1993 Draft was held in Calgary, Alberta at the Jubilee Auditorium.

Round one

Round two

Round three

Round four

Round five

Round six

Round seven

References
Canadian Draft

Canadian College Draft
Cfl Draft, 1993
1993 in Canadian football